The film industry uses many tools and types of equipment during and after production:

A
- A roll
- Ambient light
- Apple box
- Artificial light

B
- B roll
- Baby plates
- Backlot
- Background lighting
- Balloon light
- Bar clamp adapter pin
- Barn doors (lighting)
- Basso block

C
- C-Stand
- Callier effect
- Cameo lighting
- Camera boom
- Camera crane
- Camera dolly
- Clap or 'Film Clap'

D
- Diffuser (lighting)
- Digital audio tape recorder
- Digital film
- Digital negative
- Digital projection
- Dimmer (lighting)
- Dolly grip

G
- Gobo (lighting)
- Gimbal
- Gyro-stabilized camera systems

H

I

J
Jib (camera)

K

M

Matt Box

N

Film production
Production Equipment